Bardarash, also rendered as Badarash, in Iran may refer to:
 Bardarash, Kurdistan
 Bardarash-e Olya, West Azerbaijan Province
 Bardarash-e Sofla, West Azerbaijan Province